Rang De Basanti is a 2006 Indian drama film written, produced and directed by Rakeysh Omprakash Mehra. The film stars an ensemble cast including Aamir Khan, Siddharth, R. Madhavan, Atul Kulkarni, Soha Ali Khan, Sharman Joshi, Kunal Kapoor and British actress Alice Patten. It follows a British film student traveling to India to document the story of five freedom fighters of the Indian revolutionary movement. She befriends and casts five young men in the film, which inspires them to fight against the corruption of their own government.

Shot primarily in New Delhi, Rang De Basanti, was released globally on 20 January 2006. Upon release, the film broke all opening box office records in India, becoming the country's highest-grossing film in its opening weekend and holding the highest opening-day collections for a Hindi film. It received critical acclaim, winning the National Film Award for Best Popular Film, and being nominated for Best Foreign Language Film at the 2007 BAFTA Awards. The film was chosen as India's official entry for the Golden Globe Awards and the Academy Awards in the Best Foreign Language Film category, though it did not ultimately yield a nomination for either award. A. R. Rahman's soundtrack, which earned positive reviews, had two of its tracks considered for an Academy Award nomination.

Plot
In London, film student Sue McKinley finds the diary of her grandfather James, who served as a colonel of the British Army in the 1930s. James oversaw the capture and execution of the three freedom fighters — Bhagat Singh, Sukhdev and Rajguru at the Lahore Jail — and has written in his diary about his admiration for their revolutionary spirit, in spite of his being an officer of the British Empire.

Inspired by the revolutionaries' story, Sue decides to make a film on them. She travels to India, where she searches for actors with the help of her friend Sonia (Soha Ali Khan), a student of international studies at the University of Delhi. Amid a string of unsuccessful auditions, Sue meets Sonia's friends: Daljit "DJ" Singh (Aamir Khan), Karan Singhania (Siddharth), Sukhi Ram (Sharman Joshi) and Aslam Khan (Kunal Kapoor). She immediately decides to cast them in her film, with DJ as Chandra Shekhar Azad, Karan Singhania as Bhagat Singh, Aslam Khan as Ashfaqulla Khan, and Sukhi Ram as Shivaram Rajguru.

DJ, Aslam, Sukhi and the spendthrift Karan, who is the son of political well-connected businessman Rajnath Singhania, are at once carefree and cynical about their futures. While they get along well with Sue, they remain uninterested in working on a film expressing patriotism towards India. Tensions arise when Sue casts the boys' rival, the right-wing party activist Laxman Pandey, as Ram Prasad Bismil. However, over the course of working on the film, Pandey grows closer to the others. Sue begins a relationship with DJ.

The group becomes devastated when Sonia's fiancé Ajay Singh Rathod, a flight lieutenant in the Indian Air Force, is killed when his MiG-21 jet malfunctions and crashes. The government attributes the accident to pilot error and closes the case, but Sonia and her friends refuse to accept the official explanation, remembering Ajay as a skilled pilot who died while steering the plane away from crashing into a populous city. They learn that the corrupt Defense Minister Shastri, signed a contract importing cheap parts for MiG-21 aircraft in exchange for a personal favor. Karan, however, is severely jolted when he realizes that his father Rajnath was involved in orchestrating the deal.

Since working on the film has already made them imbibe idealism and galvanized them against government corruption, the group organizes a peaceful protest at the India Gate. The police arrive and violently break up the peaceful demonstration; Ajay's mother Aishwarya is beaten by the police and goes into a coma. Laxman realizes that his senior party official, Raghuvir Mishra, was in league with the government officials who ordered the police to stop the protest and becomes disillusioned with his own party. Inspired by the revolutionaries, the group decides to take action themselves. They assassinate Shastri to avenge Ajay's death, while Karan confronts and murders Rajnath.

The media reports that Shastri was killed by terrorists and celebrates him as a martyr. The group decides to publicly clarify their intent behind the assassination, and towards this end, they take over the All India Radio station after evacuating its employees and after alerting Karan's friend Rahul, who works there and is live (on air) at the moment. Karan goes on air and calls out the defense ministry's corruption to the public. The police arrive at the station under instructions to kill them. Sukhi is shot dead, while Aslam and Laxman are killed by a grenade and DJ is severely injured. DJ reunites with Karan in the recording room as the latter finishes his public statement, and the two of them get killed together.

News of the boys' death enrages the public, spurring a wave of demonstrations against the Indian government. Aishwarya awakes from her coma. The film ends with Sue describing the personal impact of meeting the boys and working on the film, while the deceased boys are seen in an afterlife-like state meeting a young Bhagat Singh in his family garden.

Cast

 Aamir Khan as Daljit "DJ" Singh / Chandra Shekhar Azad (dual role)
 Siddharth as Karan Singhania / Bhagat Singh (dual role)
 R. Madhavan as Flight Lt. Ajay Singh Rathod 
 Sharman Joshi as Sukhi Ram / Shivaram Rajguru (dual role)
 Atul Kulkarni as Lakshman Pandey / Ram Prasad Bismil (dual role)
 Kunal Kapoor as Aslam Khan / Ashfaqullah Khan (dual role)
 Soha Ali Khan as Sonia Chaudhary / Durgawati Devi (dual role)
 Alice Patten as Sue McKinley 
 Mohan Agashe as Defence Minister V. K. Shastri
 Waheeda Rehman as Mrs. Aishwarya Rathod, Ajay's mother
 Chandan Roy Sanyal as Batukeshwar Dutt
 Badrul Islam as Ravi Das / Sukhdev Thapar
 Kirron Kher as Mitro Kaur, DJ's mother
 Om Puri as Amanullah Khan, Aslam's father
 Anupam Kher as Rajnath Singhania, Karan's father
 Steven Mackintosh as James McKinley, Sue's grandfather
 Lekh Tandon as DJ's grandfather
 K. K. Raina as Raghuvir Mishra
 Cyrus Sahukar as Rahul, a radio jockey and Karan's friend
 Tushar Pandey as an auditioner (special appearance)
 Abhishek Banerjee as an auditioner (special appearance)

Production

Development
Rakeysh Omprakash Mehra took seven years to research and develop the story, including three to write the script. While some raised doubts about his morale following the failure of his last film, Aks, at the box office, he retorted by saying that it would not affect him at all. He added that not only did his storytelling technique improve, but past mistakes had helped him improve his filmmaking abilities.

Rakeysh said the following in a scriptwriter's conference conducted by the Film Writers Association in the year 2008, "I was making a documentary called Mamooli Ram, on Amul, the milk revolution with Kamalesh Pandey. We were sitting in a small hotel room in Nanded, drinking. We started singing songs, and we both realized we liked similar songs. And so Rang De Basanti was born. He was angry with the system, I was helpless with the system. We wanted to do so much. But we really can't do anything and it was born out of anger. He wrote a story called Ahuti, meaning sacrifice. Ahuti was about the armed revolution in India, between the years 1919 and 1931. It started with Ashfaqullah Khan, Ramprasad Bismil, Bhagat Singh, Rajguru, went on to Chandrashekhar Azad and so on. We had this amazing screenplay called Ahuti, which we had also termed as The Young Guns of India, which started with a train robbery, Azad on a horse and so on. I said, "let's do The Young Guns of India". We were going to go on the floor, and suddenly there were a couple of film on Bhagat Singh made. But they came and went. Not because they were good or bad films, not because they were written badly or not written so badly. I'm not being judgmental about them. And this is very important: because they did not reflect the sentiment of today's time. Nobody in the audience could identify with something which was past. It wasn't that there wasn't an idea of patriotism in us, but it was sleeping somewhere. And you had to kind of relate to it in today's world. So a couple of bottles of vodka again, and three days later, with a couple of vodkas down, Kamlesh Ji comes up with 'You know what, I think I've cracked it'."

Development of Rang De Basanti originated with several ideas Mehra came up with early on but later dropped or greatly evolved into new directions. One of these involved a group of youngsters who worked in an automobile repair shop, while another was about the life of Bhagat Singh, Indian freedom revolutionary. During this time, he personally conducted a survey with a group of youths in New Delhi and Mumbai about the Indian revolutionaries he was planning on depicting, which indicated that many of youngsters did not recognise the names of some of the most prominent revolutionaries. This led Mehra to believe that the sense of "patriotism had blurred" in the young generation. Because of this, he dropped his original plans in favour of a new idea in which a British documentary filmmaker on a visit to India realizes that the local "kids are more Western than her". This new story, which eventually formed the basis for Rang De Basanti'''s script, was influenced by Mehra's upbringing, youth and experiences over the years, including his desire to join the Indian Air Force while in school, as well as his recollections of listening to Independence Day speeches and watching patriotic films such as Mother India. Although Mehra denies that the film is autobiographical, he confessed that the character sketches were loosely inspired by himself and his friends.

Mehra approached Angad Paul after having been impressed with his production work on British films Lock, Stock and Two Smoking Barrels and Snatch. Paul, who was keen to work in India, liked Mehra's story and agreed to produce the film, bringing with him David Reid and Adam Bohling as executive producers. Despite having no prior knowledge of Hindi cinema, Reid and Bohling's belief in the script was strong enough that they each were willing to work at half their normal rate. While it was originally suggested that language versions of the film would be made concurrently, in English (as Paint it Yellow) and Hindi, the plans for an English version were dropped during development. Mehra believed that English-language version felt alien and that "one can tell a film in just one language". After the English version was dropped, the writer Kamlesh Pandey was brought on board to pen the first draft of Rang De Basanti in Hindi, marking the start of his screenwriting career. Thereafter Mehra and co-writer Rensil D'Silva took over the script, working on it for about two years. Prasoon Joshi, the film's lyricist, worked on the dialogue, marking his foray into screenwriting.Rang De Basanti suffered a significant setback when one of the initial producers ultimately failed to contribute any funds towards it; the shortfall left production looking uncertain just two months away from the beginning of principal photography. However, after Aamir Khan agreed to act in the film, Mehra approached Ronnie Screwvala of UTV Motion Pictures with the script. Screwvala, who supported Mehra from the beginning of the production, had faith in the film, reasoning that in historical films, "the treatment and execution is very different from regular masala fare", and that such films "find favour with the audience owing to their elaborate sets and period costumes". The budget was reported as Rs. 250 million (approximately US$5.5 million), and, despite going a little over the initially planned budget, Mehra did not have any serious disagreements with UTV.

The film's script originally had a different climax, originally showing the protagonists on the run. The climax was rewritten, as the idea of them running away wasn't liked mutually, as they should have the last stand resembling that of Bhagat Singh. Years earlier, Khan had written his own story with the climax in a radio station, which he adapted for the climax of Rang De Basanti.

Casting
Aamir Khan agreed to act in Rang De Basanti immediately after reading Mehra's script. Mehra described his character as a simple man with a strong sense of integrity and dignity. Atul Kulkarni and Kunal Kapoor were publicly attached to the film by the time it was officially announced; Kapoor had been the assistant director to Mehra during the filming of Aks and was already familiar with the material Mehra had been developing. Mehra gave Kulkarni biographies of Ram Prasad Bismil as preparation, including Bismil's autobiography. Early rumours indicated that actors Arjun Rampal and Arjan Bajwa would be amongst the male leads,  but these roles ultimately were filled by Siddharth and Sharman Joshi. Mehra and Khan also offered Siddharth's role to Hrithik Roshan, but he declined in favour of Krrish.Rang De Basanti marked Siddharth's Bollywood debut, following on the success of his Telugu film Nuvvostanante Nenoddantana. Having previously worked as an assistant director, Siddharth praised Mehra as being "by far the most ambitious technical filmmaker in Indian cinema". R. Madhavan, despite being a well-known Tamil cinema actor, took the smaller role of a fighter aircraft pilot because he was convinced of the film's potential and wanted to be a part of it. Om Puri appears in a two-scene cameo as Aslam's staunch Muslim father.

Soha Ali Khan and Alice Patten immediately became Mehra's clear favourites for each of their roles during casting, which led to Patten flying to Mumbai for a screen test with the entire cast. She was informed that she had won the documentary filmmaker role after she returned home to the United Kingdom. Soha, portraying the pilot's fiancée, was filming Rituparna Ghosh's Antarmahal and David Dhawan's comedy Shaadi No. 1 concurrently with her work in Rang De Basanti. In particular, the demands of her emotional scenes in Antarmahal often left her exhausted, thus requiring "a lot of personal overhauling" to ensure that her performance in Rang De Basanti was unaffected. During filming, reports indicated that co-stars Siddharth and Soha had become romantically involved with each other. Alongside the two lead actresses, Lakh Tandon played the role of Aamir's Grand Father and Kirron Kher played the mother of Khan's character.

Filming
The film, which was shot in New Delhi, Mumbai, Rajasthan and Punjab, was officially launched at a hotel on 1 February 2005. When shooting began, Mehra made an announcement to his crew saying that they would enjoy their holiday only in July.

Instead of filming at the actual locations from the script, other locations were selected for picturisation. One such scene is where Soha Ali Khan is filmed at the India Habitat Center that masquerades as the University of Delhi. On similar lines, New Delhi's Modern School at Barakhamba Road served as the location for all the scenes pertinent to All India Radio station, which is shown to be stormed by the youngsters in the film. The Delhi Tourism department was happy to encourage filming in the city if it helped promote tourism, though any filming near India Gate was prohibited due to the ensuing bureaucratic paperwork. Similar issues with bureaucracy were faced by Mehra while filming at the Jaipur Fort. To use a historical location for filming, they had to seek permissions of seven officials ranging from the local police to the Archaeological Survey of India office. Nahargarh Fort, which oversees the city of Jaipur, was another such historical location where one of the songs was filmed. Besides these locations, the filming was also done at Amritsar's Harmandir Sahib Gurudwara. For Aamir Khan, a Muslim, it was for the first time that he was playing a North Indian Punjabi character and it took him some time to get the right dialect and diction. While speaking about his experience of visiting the Gurudwara for the first time, he said:

It's one of the most peaceful places I've been to. As you enter the place there's a certain serenity that surrounds you. I really enjoyed being there. The first shot we took was of our feet entering the water just as you pass the doorway of the temple. The water was cold but it was great!

Once the locations were finalised, the team of Lovleen Bains and Arjun Bhasin was chosen for designing the look of Rang De Basanti. Bhasin had previously worked on Kama Sutra: A Tale of Love (1996) and Dil Chahta Hai (2001), the latter of which featured Aamir Khan, and he was referred to Mehra by Khan due to their previous association. Since the film's plot focused on men in their late twenties, Bhasin designed their look accordingly. Although he was responsible for Khan's rebellious look, Sharman Joshi's (who played Sukhi) lovable persona or Madhavan's dignified appearance, Bhasin credited Bains for her major contributions to the film. Khan's hair was styled by Avan Contractor, who came up with soft curls falling over Khan's forehead. This new look, which took Contractor one hour to come up with, surprised the audience at the film's launch.

In post-production, the visual effects were handled by Tata Elxsi's Visual Computing Labs. The military aircraft they created was so realistic that the Indian Air Force called to check the producer's permission of using an actual MiG-21.

Censorship
On Rang De Basanti's release, the Film Certification Board of India sought the views of Indian Defence Ministry due to scenes that depicted the use of MiG-21 fighter aircraft. But after viewing the movie the ministry found no problems and allowed UTV to release the film. There were also some issues with Animal Welfare Board of India due to the banned Indian horse race.

Music

The soundtrack of Rang De Basanti, which was released by Sony BMG, featured music composed by A. R. Rahman and lyrics penned by Prasoon Joshi and Blaaze, an India-based rapper. From the film's announcement in April 2005, Rahman was slated to compose the music. In a press conference with pop singer Nelly Furtado, he said that she was to originally have featured on the soundtrack, although this was ultimately prevented from happening due to a change in producers and other factors. Aamir Khan, with his knowledge of Hindi and Urdu, worked with Rahman and Joshi for the soundtrack. In addition, Mehra and Rahman chose him to sing for one of the songs.

Joshi was impressed with Mehra, who was ready to adjust to his style of writing as well as his creativity. Confessing that the film's soundtrack was his favourite out of all his previous works, Joshi felt that it "was a wonderful experience getting to know the mindset of today's youth and to pen down their feelings". Speaking about one of his songs, "Luka Chuppi", in which veteran Lata Mangeshkar sang with Rahman, Joshi said that it was developed while discussing with Rahman the scene about a mother losing her son. Joshi wrote the lyrics about the mother and son playing hide-and-seek with the sad reality of the son being hidden forever. He confessed to have been in tears while Mangeshkar was singing the song. The soundtrack won the Filmfare Award for Best Music Director, and had two of its tracks, Khalbali and Luka Chuppi, considered for an Academy Award for Best Original Song nomination.

While discussing typical Bollywood soundtracks, Nilanjana Bhattacharjya, a professor of music at Colorado College, noted that Rahman integrated traditional Punjabi cultural elements within his music for this soundtrack. Regionally defined elements such as a woman's prayer at the Sikh Gurdwara (Golden Temple) and the bhangra harvest dance are incorporated alongside more contemporary, global styles such as hard rock and hip hop to depict the cosmopolitan lifestyle of the youngsters in the film.

ReleaseRang De Basanti received its world premiere on 20 January 2006, with high expectations that it would be a success with western audiences, though it also faced ire from several organisations because of certain controversial scenes. The film contained scenes of a MiG-21, a controversial aircraft in the Indian Air Force, which has a long history of fatal accidents in India. Promptly, the Indian Defence Ministry raised concerns, causing the Indian censor board to urge the filmmakers to seek clearance from the ministry. Accordingly, Khan and Mehra screened the film for the then Defence Minister Pranab Mukherjee along with other top officials from the armed forces. One Air Force official reportedly said that it was "not a review, but a preview". After the special screening, the defence ministry did not insist on any cuts, but on their recommendation more names were added to the slide that dedicates the film to deceased MiG pilots. After this clearance, the Animal Welfare Board raised objections on the use of animals in the film. Although the filmmakers had obtained a No Objection Certificate from the board officials, Maneka Gandhi, a well-known animal rights activist and member of the welfare board, found flaws in this certificate. Subsequently, this certificate was revoked and with only a few days left for the world premiere, Mehra personally requested Gandhi to reconsider her objection. After another viewing, the board cleared their objection stating that the use of animals in the film was natural and justified. However, after they recommended the deletion of a 20-second scene that depicted a banned horse race conducted by the Nihang Sikhs, the filmmakers deleted this scene. Mrs. Kavita Gadgil whose son, late Flight Lieutenant Abhijeet Gadgil was killed when his MiG-21 fighter crashed, objected to the film's release because she believed that the film was loosely based on her son's life and the producers should have shown her the film. In response, Kamlesh Pandey, one of the writers of the film, said that the film was not inspired by Abhijeet Gadgil.

The film was screened at several international film festivals. In 2006, it premiered in France with the Lyon Asiexpo Film Festival, the Wisconsin Film Festival and the Morocco-based International Film Festival of Marrakech. As a part of the publicity, the cast, visited prominent University campuses in New Delhi, Mumbai, Kolkata, Hyderabad and Pune with an intention of interacting with the students. This expenditure was unprecedented in Bollywood because usually the Indian filmmakers spend only about five percent of their production budget on marketing. Out of the  marketing campaign, a fifth of it came from the producers while the rest was obtained through brand tie-ups and partnering.

There were high expectations from the soundtrack in the media. The soundtrack, first released commercially in early December 2005, generally received above average reviews. One of the songs, "Masti Ki Paatshaala" (translation: "Classroom of Fun"), was voted as the "Song of the year" for 2006 by leading Indian television channels, while two compositions were considered for an Academy Award nomination.

Before its theatrical release, the producers tied up with several top brands to help in the marketing the film. An alliance was formed with The Coca-Cola Company by releasing special edition bottles to commemorate the film's release, a first of its kind in Bollywood. Besides this, the music CDs and cassettes were co-branded with the cola company along with the launch of the sale of collectibles from the film. Provogue, a well-known clothing retail chain in India, launched a special limited edition clothing merchandise targeting the youth of India. Besides these, the producers collaborated with LG Group, Berger Paints, Bharti Airtel and Hindustan Petroleum. The producers tied up with several media partners such as MSN India, Channel V and Radio Mirchi to further enhance their marketing efforts. A video game launched by an Indian mobile content company was based on an adaptation of the film's plot.

In India, The Hindu reported that with audiences from the metropolitan cities turning out in large numbers, Rang De Basanti was notching up record collections in its opening week. Accordingly, 55 percent of the film's revenues came from multiplexes in these cities. Released in about 60 theatres in the United States, the film grossed  in its opening weekend and earned  within 10 weeks. With  alone coming from the Indian territory, the film earned more than  worldwide. Currently, the film holds the record for the highest-grossing film to be released in January.

A report carried out by The Times of India highlighted copyright infringement on the Internet where movies like Rang De Basanti could be downloaded freely. The DVD release sold more than 70,000 copies over six months, and as a result the film was the highest selling title at the time of its release.Rang De Basanti was released on Blu-ray (plus steelbook edition) in May 2014. It is also available on Netflix.

Reception
Critical reception
Critics gave the film an overwhelmingly positive response, in particular the ensemble cast's performance and credibility. Although The Indian Express spoke positively of the cinematography and the film's story, it noted that "the message that the film carries with it tends to get diluted towards the climax. Praising the film's cast for their performance and the cinematography of Binod Pradhan, Taran Ardash wrote that the film would be successful with the urban audiences. The Hindustan Times summarised the film as being a "well-scripted, skilfully crafted [and] thought-provoking entertainer". Saisuresh Sivaswamy of Rediff.com wrote that films like Rang De Basanti can easily get into "preachiness", but believed Mehra got his message across while avoiding this, also appreciating the music, cinematography, dialogues and art direction. The Hindu credited Kamlesh Pandey for writing a story that would have been a difficult film to make, but it added by saying that the transformation of the youngsters into heroes seemed poetic. Although the screenplay, direction and the cast were also well-appreciated, the reviewer felt that Rahman's soundtrack lacked pace.

The film also received positive reviews from critics outside India. The review from the BBC gave it the highest possible five star rating and added that it was "an entertaining mix of romance, history and social commentary". The Bloomberg website wrote positively about "the raw energy of a young cast and A. R. Rahman's splendidly rousing soundtrack".

Sight & Sound magazine conducts a poll every ten years of the world's finest film directors to find out the Ten Greatest Films of All Time. This poll has been going since 1992, and has become the most recognised poll of its kind in the world. In 2012 Cyrus Frisch voted for "Rang De Basanti". Frisch commented: "Corruption became the subject of fierce debate in India after the major success of this film among youngsters."

The film was mentioned in critic and author Shubhra Gupta's book, 50 Films That Changed Bollywood, 1995–2015.

Climax
A major point of criticism the film faced was regarding the possibility of the Indian Army attacking students in a radio station. When Rakeysh was questioned about the same in a scriptwriter's conference conducted by the Film Writers Association in the year 2008, he said the following, "So, in 2005, in Allahabad, a bunch of 4 students took the TV station there, and they were shot dead. Everything I did, it was kind of borrowed, as I said right here. Obviously, what I am also learning is the way I tell a story is not real; you can term it as a-real. For maximum impact, for the message to go through, I felt—since the story was against the establishment—let the establishment do it. After all, the establishment did hang Bhagat Singh. After all, the establishment did come down on the innocent, innocent students in Mandal Commission. After all the establishment did come down on Tiananmen Square. After all the establishment did come down when the whole concept of Flower Power emerged in America. So it's all there. It's borrowed, maybe not as realistically, but it is definitely there in the society. During emergency, there are horror stories. If we have to go back to Kriplani and his movement in Bihar, the stories are absolutely horrific."

2007 Academy Awards Best Foreign Film submission
Since the film "reflected contemporary Indian reality and had cinematic excellence", it was chosen as India's official entry for the 79th Academy Awards despite stiff competition from films such as Krrish, Omkara, Kabhi Alvida Naa Kehna and Lage Raho Munna Bhai. While discussing if the selection committee's choice was correct, critics felt that the Academy members could have better related with Omkara, an adaptation of Shakespeare's play Othello. Despite these qualms and Mehra's belief that his film did not stand a chance at the Oscars, the efforts to publicise the film in the United States began earnestly. Music composer A. R. Rahman performed several concerts across the East Coast to promote the film. Besides his efforts, producer Screwvala planned to use resources and expertise from his partners in 20th Century Fox and Walt Disney Pictures for organising its publicity efforts. When the nominations in the foreign film category did not feature this film, it sparked off debates on whether the film should have been India's entry for the Oscars. In one such debate on a television channel that involved Screwvala, the selection committee was questioned about its knowledge of the requisite artistic criteria for such award ceremonies. While one outcome of the debate was on how Omkara would have been a better choice, the other discussed the West-centric sensibilities of the Academy members. However, results from a simultaneously conducted SMS poll indicated that 62 percent felt that the film was the right choice for the Oscars.

Accolades

The film was selected as India's official entry to the 79th Academy Awards for Best Foreign Language Film but it was not Nominated.

Social influenceRang De Basanti had a noticeable impact on Indian society. A study of bloggers behavioural patterns during the first month of the film's release revealed a significant increase in public ire towards government and politicians for constantly being mired in corruption and bureaucracy and their inefficiency in providing basic amenities. Intense political discussions spurred on by the film's influence were observed in these patterns. While commenting on this, writer D'Silva said that the film "has struck a chord somewhere". Besides instigating political thought and discussions, it evoked social awakening for many. Some discussions rallied on how citizens should support and contribute to non-governmental organisations and exercising simple citizen duties of paying taxes and voting, while the others contemplated on how to become more responsible towards the country. Unlike other Indian films with jingoistic overtones, many young Indians could relate well to the characters of this film.

While such reactions were observed on the Internet, youth activism took to streets to protest on public interest issues. A direct impact was on the 1999 Jessica Lall Murder Case, one of the high-profile murder cases in India. A month after the film's release, a court acquitted the main accused because of inefficient prosecution and hostile witnesses. This sparked intense civil protests and media campaigns that sought his re-arrest. Taking cue from the scene in which the protagonists hold a silent, candlelight vigil at New Delhi's India Gate, one such group of demonstrators carried out a similar rally to voice their protest. Shortly thereafter, a survey was conducted to assess reasons for the sudden upsurge in people's social involvements. Eighteen percent of the respondents felt that movies like Rang De Basanti were the main reason behind it. Another such massive youth activism was seen in the Priyadarshini Mattoo rape and murder case where similar rallies were organised in India, United States and around the world. Following the release of the film, another social outcry was against the introduction of reservations for socially backward classes in educational institutions. Young doctors and engineers joined hands in peaceful rallies in major cities across India. Though the film was not released in the neighbouring Pakistan, it evoked similar reactions there. Inspired by the film, Pakistan's national newspaper, Jang, launched a television channel that was to focus on citizens' issues and support public awakening. Reacting to these strong social reactions, actor Kunal Kapoor thought that the film was just a catalyst that presented "patriotism in a package that the youngsters understood and empathised with".

In the Indian media, frequent referencing of the film was evident, with many brands using pictorials from the movie. In addition, the media also uses the terms "RDB" (abbreviated title of the movie) and "RDB effect" while referring to instances of public activism on matters of public interest. When the 2007 University of Delhi Student Elections focused more on the important issues facing the students than in the previous years, one student referred to this as the "RDB Syndrome". On similar lines, Kamal Sunavala wrote a play titled Under the Influence which focuses on a young Indian expatriate whose life changes after watching this film.

Further reading

 Dilip, Meghna (2008), "Rang De Basanti – Consumption, Citizenship And The Public Sphere", Master of Arts Thesis, University of Massachusetts, Amherst, February 2008.

Notes

References

External links
 
 
 
 
 Rang De Basanti'' at Rediff.com

2006 films
2000s Hindi-language films
Indian aviation films
Indian buddy films
Films set in Delhi
Films about corruption in India
Films shot in Delhi
Films scored by A. R. Rahman
Indian nonlinear narrative films
Films shot in Mumbai
Films shot in Rajasthan
Films shot in Punjab, India
UTV Motion Pictures films
Films whose editor won the Best Film Editing National Award
Best Popular Film Providing Wholesome Entertainment National Film Award winners
Films that won the Best Audiography National Film Award
Cultural depictions of Bhagat Singh
Films directed by Rakeysh Omprakash Mehra
Films about aviation accidents or incidents